James Baillie (1860 – April 7, 1935) was a woodworker, merchant, contractor and political figure in Quebec. He served as mayor of Aylmer from 1914 to 1916.

He was the son of Scottish immigrants who settled in Aylmer in 1850: James Baillie, a woodworker, and Elizabeth Gow. He married Jessie Catherine McIntosh. In 1890, with his brother William, he built a steam-powered sawmill. They also built boats and sold lumber. Baillie served on the Aylmer municipal council and on the South Hull township council. 
 He also was a building contractor, building summer resorts on both sides of the Ottawa River.

Baillie died at home in Aylmer at the age of 75.

The Baillie sawmill played an important role in the development of the town and continued to operate until 1940. A plaque marks its former location.

References 

1860 births
1935 deaths
Mayors of places in Quebec